HD 47536 b is an extrasolar planet located approximately 400 light-years away. Its inclination and thereby true mass is being calculated via astrometry with Hubble. The astrometricians expect publication by mid-2009.

See also
 HD 47536 c

References

External links
 

Canis Major
Giant planets
Exoplanets discovered in 2003
Exoplanets detected by radial velocity